Sunari Wala is a village located south east to Depalpur Tehsil, Okara District in the Lahore Division of Punjab, Pakistan. The River Beas flows nearby.

It is an agricultural village with a population of about 1000 people. A large number of the people have not land of their own for cultivation, but instead they work as labourers in farms of landlords.

The village has no dispensary. It has a primary school for boys only, but there is no school for girls.
Chak shaam din and Mustafabad are its neighbour villages.
Maize and potato are its major agriculture fields.
The farmers of this village are not educated. They use traditional methods for farming.
Farmers cultivated two fields in a year. The farmers have also kept domestic animals like buffaloes and cows in their houses. The women of this village are also uneducated. They work in their houses as well as in fields along with their men. Their condition is very miserable. They have to work from dawn to dusk without any pay.

References

Villages in Okara District